Societat Esportiva Eivissa-Ibiza B was a football team based in Ibiza Town in the autonomous community of Balearic Islands. Founded in 2005, it plays in the Preferente. It was the reserve team of UD Ibiza-Eivissa.

History
The first team Societat Esportiva Eivissa-Ibiza was founded in 1995 as Unión Deportiva Ibiza. In 1997 the team is renamed to Club Esportiu Eivissa and, in 2001, is renamed with its original denomination.

The second team founded in 2005. It was dissolved in 2009 following the relegation of first team to Regional de Ibiza.

Season to season

1 season in Tercera División
3 seasons in Categorías Regionales

External links
Official website 
Unofficial website 

Sport in Ibiza
Association football clubs established in 2005
Association football clubs disestablished in 2009
Spanish reserve football teams
Defunct football clubs in the Balearic Islands
2005 establishments in Spain
2009 disestablishments in Spain

es:Unión Deportiva Ibiza Eivissa